Hexabranchidae is a monotypic family of colorful nudibranchs (often called "sea slugs") which contains only a single genus Hexabranchus, with two species, and has no subfamilies.

This family is one of the many families of dorid nudibranchs in the suborder Doridina, named after Doris, who was a sea nymph in ancient Greek mythology.

The genus contains one of the largest known species of nudibranch in the world, H. sanguineus, which grows up to or exceeding 40 cm in length. This species is known to use chemical defenses derived from the sponge it eats and use the chemical compounds to defend itself from potential fish predators.

Species
There are two species within the genus Hexabranchus: 
 Hexabranchus morsomus Ev. Marcus & Er. Marcus, 1962
 Hexabranchus sanguineus (Ruppell & Leuckart, 1828) - synonym: Hexabranchus praetextus Ehrenberg, 1828 - type species

References